The Masked Dancer may refer to:

 The Masked Dancer (film), a lost 1924 American silent romance film
 The Masked Dancer (American TV series), a spinoff of the South Korean reality TV franchise The Masked Singer
 The Masked Dancer (British TV series), based on the American TV series
 The Masked Dancer (German TV series), based on the American TV series